Saeid Ahmadi Karyani (also Romanized as "Sa'īd Ahmadī (Karyānī)"; born on October 2, 1988 in Kermanshah) is an Iranian karateka and current professional personal trainer. He has participated in three world championships and he won two golds and a silver medal. He also won the silver medal in 2012 and 2014 and 2016 world championships.

He began karate training at age eight, with his first coach Touraj Sasani at Azadegan Karate Club and, from 2008 to 2011, won several medals of provincial and national karate. In 2012, he became a member of the Iran karate national team.

See also
Amir Mehdizadeh
Sajad Ganjzadeh
Bahman Asgari
Samaneh Khoshghadam

References

External links 
 saeid-ahmadi-karyani Profile in Karate Records
 wkf ranking
Saeid Ahmadi on Instagram

1988 births
Sportspeople from Kermanshah
Living people
Iranian male karateka
World Games silver medalists
21st-century Iranian people